The esplumoir Merlin is a place mentioned in the Arthurian legend (notably the ) in relation with the magician Merlin.  Its nature remains uncertain, but it probably relates to a metamorphosis into a bird.  It is presented as a hut, a tower or a high rock and is sometimes likened to the Hotié de Viviane, a megalithic site in Brittany.  It is also mentioned in Raoul de Houdenc's narrative poem, Meraugis de Portlesguez.

Etymology 

Etymologically, an esplumoir would be "a cage where a songbird is locked away at the time of moulting: a dark and warm place where the bird sings in its own feathers".  However, the meaning of the word esplumoir as used in the romances remains unknown. It could be a word from Old French whose meaning has been lost through manuscript transmission.

Description 

The esplumoir is thought to be the place where Merlin, who is fond of transforming himself into a bird, would resume his human form.  According to the Didot Perceval it is a cabin or a small house that Merlin built himself near the home of Perceval, guardian of the Grail, to prophesy.  It is also imagined as a high tower or a rock, in other texts.  In Méraugis de Portlesguez it is described as being atop a high cliff having no doors, windows or stairs; it is inhabited by twelve damsels who can tell the future.

This place is mentioned by the poet Jacques Roubaud as being hot and dark, located at the top of "la roche grifaigne". Merlin, in the form of a bird, sings of the future there. Jacques Roubaud also explains the shadow that Perceval sees pass several times above him, accompanied by the voice of Merlin, by supposing the metamorphosis of the magician into a bird.

Footnotes

References 

 
 

Fictional buildings and structures originating in literature
Fictional elements introduced in the 13th century
Locations associated with Arthurian legend
Works based on Merlin